The Women's 200 metres T11 event at the 2012 Summer Paralympics took place at the London Olympic Stadium from 1 to 2 September. The event consisted of 4 heats, 2 semifinals and a final.

Records
Prior to the competition, the existing World and Paralympic records were as follows:

Results

Round 1
Competed 1 September 2012 from 10:53. Qual. rule: winner of each heat (Q) plus the 4 fastest other times (q) qualified.

Heat 1

Heat 2

Heat 3

Heat 4

Semifinals
Competed 2 September 2012 from 10:00. Qual. rule: winner of each heat (Q) plus the two fastest other times (q) qualified.

Heat 1

Heat 2

Final
Competed 2 September 2012 at 19:24.

 
Q = qualified by place. q = qualified by time. PR = Paralympic Record. RR = Regional Record. PB = Personal Best. SB = Seasonal Best.

References

Athletics at the 2012 Summer Paralympics
2012 in women's athletics